The Meliana climbing salamander (Bolitoglossa meliana) is a species of salamander in the family Plethodontidae.
It is endemic to Guatemala.

Its natural habitat is subtropical or tropical moist montane forests.
It is threatened by habitat loss.

References

Bolitoglossa
Endemic fauna of Guatemala
Amphibians of Guatemala
Amphibians described in 1982
Taxonomy articles created by Polbot